The 1948 Boston College Eagles football team represented Boston College as an independent during the 1948 college football season. The Eagles were led by fifth-year head coach Denny Myers and played their home games at Braves Field in Boston, Massachusetts. Boston College finished with a record of 5–2–2.

Schedule

References

Boston College
Boston College Eagles football seasons
Boston College Eagles football
1940s in Boston